Schuld is a municipality in the district of Ahrweiler, in Rhineland-Palatinate, Germany, on the River Ahr. 

In July 2021, the village was severely damaged by floods. Approximately 50 houses were damaged. The town had previously been devastated by another flash flood in 1910 in which 50 villagers perished.

References

Ahrweiler (district)